Luc Etienne Durandt (born 1 September 1989) is a South African born English cricketer.  Durandt is a left-handed batsman who bowls right-arm medium.  He was born in Johannesburg, Transvaal Province and was educated at Wellington College.

Durandt made a single Minor Counties Championship appearance for Berkshire against Cheshire in 2009.  Later, while studying for his degree in Sport at Collingwood College, Durham, Durandt made his first-class debut for Durham MCCU against Nottinghamshire in 2010.  He has made four further first-class appearances for the team, the last of which came against Yorkshire in 2011.  In his five first-class matches, he scored 280 runs at an average of 40.00, with a high score of 131.  This score came against Warwickshire in 2011.  With the ball, he took 3 wickets at a bowling average of 42.00, with best figures of 3/65.

Durandt has also played for a number of county Second XI's.

References

External links
Luc Durandt at ESPNcricinfo

1989 births
Living people
Cricketers from Johannesburg
English sportspeople of South African descent
People educated at Wellington College, Berkshire
Alumni of Collingwood College, Durham
English cricketers
Berkshire cricketers
Durham MCCU cricketers
English cricketers of the 21st century